Heliothis xanthiata is a species of moth of the family Noctuidae first described by Francis Walker in 1865. It is found in Africa, including and possibly limited to South Africa and Lesotho.

External links
 
 

Heliothis
Moths described in 1865